West Central Liberal Synagogue  was a Liberal Jewish community in Bloomsbury in the London Borough of Camden. The congregation was founded by Lily Montagu in 1928 (although it could trace its roots to services she held in the 1890s) and it had held services at The Montagu Centre since 1954.

The synagogue's last Rabbi, until its closure in 2022, was Jackie Tabick.

References

External links

1928 establishments in England
2022 disestablishments in England
Bloomsbury
Former synagogues in London
Jewish organizations established in 1928
Liberal synagogues in the United Kingdom
Religion in the London Borough of Camden